Lee Yi Ping (born ) is a Taiwanese female volleyball player. She was part of the Chinese Taipei women's national volleyball team.

She participated in the 2012 FIVB Volleyball World Grand Prix.

References

External links
 Profile at FIVB.org

1989 births
Living people
Taiwanese women's volleyball players
Place of birth missing (living people)